Dave McNeil was an English professional footballer who played as a full back in the Football League for Chester.

References

1921 births
1993 deaths
Sportspeople from Chester
Association football fullbacks
English footballers
Chester City F.C. players
Holywell Town F.C. players
English Football League players